Hiob or Job Ludolf ( or ; 15 June 1624– 8 April 1704), also known as Job Leutholf, was a German orientalist,  born at Erfurt. Edward Ullendorff rates Ludolf as having "the most illustrious name in Ethiopic scholarship".

Life

After studying philology at the Erfurt academy and at Leiden, he travelled in order to increase his linguistic knowledge. While searching in Rome for some documents at the request of the Swedish Court (1649), he became friends with Abba Gorgoryos, a monk from the Ethiopian province of Amhara, and acquired from him an intimate knowledge of the Ethiopian language of Amhara.

In 1652 he entered the service of the duke of Saxe-Gotha, in which he continued until 1678, when he retired to Frankfurt am Main. In 1683 he visited England to promote a cherished scheme for establishing trade with Ethiopia, but his efforts were unsuccessful, chiefly due to the resistance of the authorities of the Ethiopian Orthodox Church. Returning to Frankfurt in 1684, he devoted himself wholly to literary work, which he continued almost to his death. In 1690 he was appointed president of the Collegium Imperiale Historicum.

His correspondence with Leibniz on linguistics was published in 1755 by August Benedict Michaelis.

Ludolf died at Frankfurt.

Works

The works of Ludolf, who is said to have been acquainted with twenty-five languages, include Sciagraphia historiae aethiopicae (Jena, 1676); and the Historia aethiopica (Frankfort, 1681), which has been translated into English, French and Dutch, and which was supplemented by a Commentarius (1691) and by Appendices (1693–1694). According to Ullendorff, Ludolf's 
Ethiopic and Amharic dictionaries and grammars were of importance far transcending his own time and remained, for well over a century and a half, the indispensable tools for the study of these languages, while his monumental history of Ethiopia (with an extensive commentary) can still be read with profit as well as enjoyment.

Among his other works are:
Grammatica linguae amharicae (Frankfort, 1698)
Lexicon amharico-latinum (Frankfort, 1698)
Lexicon aethiopico-latinum (Frankfort, 1699)
Grammatica aethiopica (London, 1661, and Frankfort, 1702)
 His posthumously published Allgemeine Schau-Bühne der Welt (1713 in Frankfurt am Main) is noted for the detailed account given of 1652 Batih massacre, a mass execution of Polish captives by Ukrainian Cossacks.

References

Citations

Bibliography
 Christian Juncker, Commentarius de vita et scriptis Jobi Ludolfi (Frankfort, 1710)
 Ludwig Diestel, Geschichte des alten Testaments in der christlichen Kirche (Jena, 1868)
 Johannes Flemming, "Hiob Ludolf," in the Beiträge zur Assyriologie (Leipzig, 1890-1891)
  
 John T. Waterman (1978), Leibniz and Ludolf on Things Linguistic: Excerpts from Their Correspondence (1688-1703). translated and edited with commentary and notes. Berkeley: University of California Publications in Linguistics 88.

External links
 
 
 Pictures from a supplementary volume to Ludolf's Historia Aethiopica in Early Printed Books at St. John's College Library website.
 Psalterium Davidis aethiopice et latine at the Hill Museum & Manuscript Library (HMML).
 Hiob Ludolf in die Erfurt-Enzyklopädie website.
 Nouvelle histoire d'Abyssinie ou d'Ethiopie tirée de l'histoire latine—a French translation of Ludolf's Historia aethiopica (Paris 1684) in Gallica, the digital library of the Bibliothèque nationale de France (PDF).
 A new history of Ethiopia being a full and accurate description of the kingdom of Abessinia, vulgarly, though erroneously, called the Empire of Prester John by the learned Job Ludolphus, translated out of his learned manuscript commentary on this history (1684) available on Early English Books Online

1624 births
1704 deaths
History of Ethiopia
Ethiopianists
German orientalists
German philologists
Writers from Erfurt
17th-century German writers
German male non-fiction writers
17th-century German male writers